Rafael "Rafi" Menco (born March 5, 1994) is an Israeli professional basketball player for Maccabi Tel Aviv of the Israeli Basketball Premier League and the EuroLeague. He was named the Israeli Basketball Premier League Most Improved Player in 2017, and an Israeli Basketball Premier League All-Star in 2019.

Early life
Menco was born in Jerusalem. He played basketball for Wingate Institute youth academy.

Professional career

Early years (2012–2016)
In 2012, Menco started his professional career with Hapoel Jerusalem. On October 21, 2012, Menco made his professional debut in a match against Hapoel Tel Aviv.

On July 17, 2014, Menco was loaned to Hapoel Gilboa Galil for the 2014–15 season. On April 25, 2015, Menco recorded a season-high 18 points, shooting 7-of-11 from the field, along with five rebounds, two assists, and three steals in an 89–72 win over Maccabi Tel Aviv. In 31 games played for Gilboa Galil, he averaged 7.9 points, 4.7 rebounds, 1.8 assists, and 1.1 steals per game.

On June 20, 2015, Menco signed a three-year deal with Hapoel Jerusalem. On February 3, 2016, Menco recorded a season-high 18 points, shooting 8-of-12 from the field, along with five rebounds and four steals in a 94–103 loss to Avtodor Saratov. Menco won the 2016 Israeli League Cup title with Jerusalem.

Hapoel Eilat (2016–2017)
On November 25, 2016, Menco was loaned to Hapoel Eilat for the 2016–17 season. On March 20, 2017, Menco recorded a double-double of 22 points and a career-high 13 rebounds, shooting 8-of-12 from the field, leading Eilat to a 94–85 win over Maccabi Rishon LeZion. He was subsequently named Israeli League Round 23 MVP. On March 29, Menco was named the Israeli Player of the Month for games played in March.

In 28 games played for Eilat, he averaged 9.3 points, 6 rebounds, 1.8 assists and 1.1 steals per game. Menco helped Eilat reach the 2017 Israeli League Playoffs as the second seed, but they eventually were eliminated by Maccabi Rishon LeZion in the Quarterfinals. On June 6, 2017, Menco was named co-Israeli Basketball Premier League Most Improved Player, alongside Idan Zalmanson and earned a spot in the All-Israeli League Second Team.

Hapoel Tel Aviv (2017–2018)
On July 26, 2017, Menco joined Hapoel Tel Aviv, signing a one-year deal with an option for another one. On January 2, 2018, Menco recorded a season-high 17 points, shooting 7-of-14 from the field, along with six rebounds and two assists in a 77–73 win over Maccabi Tel Aviv. Menco helped Hapoel reach the 2018 Israeli League Final Four for the first time in 13 years.

On July 5, 2018, Menco signed a one-year contract extension with Hapoel. However, on December 5, 2018, Menco parted ways with Hapoel.

Return to Eilat (2018–2020)
On December 24, 2018, Menco returned to Hapoel Eilat for a second stint, signing for the rest of the season. In 28 games played for Eilat during the 2018–-19 season, he averaged 8.8 points, 3.1 rebounds and 1.6 assists per game, while shooting 43.2 percent from three-point range. Menco helped Eilat reach the 2019 Israeli League Final Four, where they eventually lost to Maccabi Tel Aviv.

On November 3, 2019, Menco recorded a then career-high 24 points, shooting 10-of-12 from the field in a 90–81 win over Hapoel Holon. Three days later, he was named Israeli League Round 5 MVP. On February 16, 2020, Menco recorded a career-high 25 points, while shooting 9-of-12 from the field, along with seven rebounds and three assists, leading Eilat to an 89-84 win over Ironi Nahariya. He was subsequently named Israeli League Round 19 MVP. He averaged 13.4 points and 5.2 rebounds per game.

Élan Chalon (2020–2021)
On July 17, 2020, Menco signed with Élan Chalon of the LNB Pro A. On September 13, 2020, Élan Chalon won the pre-season LUXTROPHY tournament, and Menco rewarded to be the MVP of the tournament with 17 points and evaluation of 21.

Hapoel Holon (2021–present)
On July 29, 2021, Menco signed with Hapoel Holon of the Israeli Basketball Premier League.

National team career
Menco is a member of the Israeli national basketball team. On November 24, 2017, he made his first appearance for the senior team at the 2019 FIBA Basketball World Cup qualification match against Estonia.

Menco was also a member of the U-16, U-18 and U-20 Israeli national teams.

References

External links
 RealGM profile
 Eurobasket profile

1994 births
Living people
Competitors at the 2019 Summer Universiade
Hapoel Eilat basketball players
Hapoel Gilboa Galil Elyon players
Hapoel Holon players
Hapoel Jerusalem B.C. players
Hapoel Tel Aviv B.C. players
Israeli men's basketball players
Maccabi Tel Aviv B.C. players
Small forwards